Robert Turnbull (January 11, 1850 – January 22, 1920) was a U.S. Representative from Virginia.

Biography
Born in Lawrenceville, Virginia, Turnbull attended Rock Spring Academy, and graduated from the law department of the University of Virginia at Charlottesville in 1871.

Career
Admitted to the bar in 1871, Turnbull began his legal practice in Lawrenceville, Virginia, the county seat of Brunswick County. He won election as clerk of Brunswick County, and served for a decade, from 1891–1910. During this period, Turnbull also won election to the part time position representing his county in the Senate of Virginia, and served from 1894–1898. Brunswick County voters also elected him as delegate to the Virginia Constitutional Convention of 1902. Turnbull was also a delegate to the Democratic National Conventions in 1896 and 1904.

Following the death of Francis R. Lassiter, Turnbull won election as a Democrat to the Sixty-first Congress to fill the vacancy. He won reelection once, to the Sixty-second Congress and served from March 8, 1910, to March 3, 1913. Judge Walter A. Watson of Nottoway County (who unlike Turnbull had voted against restricting voting by blacks and poor whites) defeated Turnbull in the Democratic primary in 1912.

Turnbull resumed his legal practice in Lawrenceville, and again won election as clerk of the circuit court of Brunswick County, serving from 1916 until his death, January 22, 1920.

Death and legacy
He was interred in Lawrenceville Cemetery, Lawrenceville, Virginia.

Electoral history

1910; Turnbull was elected to the U.S. House of Representatives unopposed in a special election and was re-elected in the general election unopposed.
1912; Turnbull lost his re-election bid.

References

1850 births
1920 deaths
Virginia lawyers
Democratic Party Virginia state senators
Delegates to Virginia Constitutional Convention of 1901
20th-century American politicians
County clerks in Virginia
Democratic Party members of the United States House of Representatives from Virginia
People from Lawrenceville, Virginia
Burials in Virginia
19th-century American lawyers